Bring Your Smile Along is a 1955 American Technicolor comedy film by Blake Edwards. It was Edwards' directorial debut and the motion picture debut of Constance Towers. Edwards wrote the script for this Frankie Laine musical with his mentor, director Richard Quine. Songs Laine sang in the film included his 1951 hit "The Gandy Dancers' Ball."

Plot
New England schoolteacher Nancy Willows leaves her school and fiancée David Parker to go to New York City for a career as a lyricist. Her neighbors across the hall are an easy going singer named Jerry Dennis and his hotheaded songwriter roommate Marty Adams who is incapable of writing acceptable lyrics for his songs.

Cast

Edwards and Quine's partnership
Quine and Edwards would subsequently write He Laughed Last for Laine. Edwards had previously written several scripts for Quine to direct: Sound Off was a 1952 service comedy starring Mickey Rooney; Rainbow 'Round My Shoulder was an earlier Laine vehicle from the same team; and All Ashore was Quine and Edwards' variation on On the Town teaming Rooney and Dick Haymes. Haymes also starred in their Cruisin' Down the River. Edwards directed second unit on Quine's Drive a Crooked Road, which cast Rooney against type and featured Quine and Edwards' script. Edwards continued working with Quine after launching his own directing career. Their latterday efforts included the early Jack Lemmon films: My Sister Eileen, Operation Mad Ball, and The Notorious Landlady. Quine and Edwards also created the short-lived sitcom The Mickey Rooney Show, and developed Rooney's 1954 spoof, The Atomic Kid, for Republic Pictures.

See also
List of American films of 1955

References

External links 
 
 
 
 

1955 films
American comedy films
Films directed by Blake Edwards
Columbia Pictures films
1955 comedy films
Films with screenplays by Blake Edwards
1955 directorial debut films
1950s English-language films
1950s American films